The Electoral district of City of Melbourne was one of the original sixteen electoral districts of the old unicameral Victorian Legislative Council of 1851 to 1856; Victoria having been made a separate colony in Australia in the former year.

The Electoral district of City of Melbourne's area contained the North Melbourne and part of Jika Jika parishes, and was bound in part by Merri Creek, Moonee Ponds and Hobson's Bay.

William Westgarth had been a representative in the New South Wales Legislative Council for the City of Melbourne, and topped the poll for this new district in Victoria.

From 1856 onwards, the Victorian parliament consisted of two houses, the Victorian Legislative Council (upper house, consisting of Provinces) and the Victorian Legislative Assembly (lower house).

Members

Three members initially, the election results were declared on 13 September 1851, members sworn-in November 1851. Six members from the expansion of the Council in 1853.

See also
 Parliaments of the Australian states and territories
 List of members of the Victorian Legislative Council

Notes
 = resigned
 = by-election

Greeves went on to represent the Electoral district of East Bourke in the Victorian Legislative Assembly from November 1856.
O'Shanassy went on to represent the Electoral district of Kilmore in the Victorian Legislative Assembly from November 1856.
Smith went on to represent the Electoral district of Melbourne in the Victorian Legislative Assembly from November 1856.
Hodgson went on to represent Central Province in the Victorian Legislative Council from November 1856.
Sargood went on to represent the Electoral district of St Kilda in the Victorian Legislative Assembly from November 1856.

Election results
13 September 1851, first three members elected (*).

References

Former electoral districts of Victorian Legislative Council
1851 establishments in Australia
1856 disestablishments in Australia
History of Melbourne